On November 6, 1990, Washington, D.C., held an election for its mayor, with Democratic candidate Sharon Pratt Dixon defeating Republican Maurice Turner.

Sharon Pratt Dixon announced at the 1988 Democratic National Convention that she would challenge incumbent mayor Marion Barry in the 1990 election.  Pratt was the only candidate to have officially announced her plans to run for mayor when Barry was arrested on drug charges and dropped out of the race in early 1990. Shortly thereafter, the race was joined by longtime councilmembers John Ray, Charlene Drew Jarvis and David Clarke.  Pratt criticized her three main opponents, referring to them as the "three blind mice" who "saw nothing, said nothing and did nothing as the city rapidly decayed."  She was the only candidate who called on Barry to resign from office, and ran specifically as an outsider to his political machine with the campaign slogan of "Clean House."

Following a series of televised debates during the last few weeks of the campaign, Pratt received the endorsement of The Washington Post. The day the endorsement appeared, her poll numbers skyrocketed, with many political observers attributing the rise specifically to the Post's backing.  On the eve of the election, polls showed Councilmember John Ray holding the lead, but Pratt gaining ground fast and a large margin of undecided voters remaining. However, even with the smallest campaign staff and least money, Pratt won the election, defeating second-place Ray by 10%. As Washington is a heavily Democratic city, Dixon's victory over Republican former police chief Maurice T. Turner, Jr., in the November 6 general election was a foregone conclusion.

Democratic primary

General election

References

Mayoral
Washington, D.C.
1990
Washington, D.C.